This page details the match results and statistics of the South Africa national soccer team from 2000 to 2009.

Results
South Africa's score is shown first in each case.

Notes

References

2000-2009
2000s in South Africa